Colotis erone, the coast purple tip, is a butterfly of the family Pieridae. It is found in the Afrotropical realm and is endemic to Natal, Pondoland, Eswatini, and Transvaal.

The wingspan is 40–50 mm. The adults fly year-round, peaking from December to January and March to July.

The larvae feed on Maerua racemulosa and Maerua pedunculosa.

References

Seitz, A. Die Gross-Schmetterlinge der Erde 13: Die Afrikanischen Tagfalter. Plate XIII 17

erone
Butterflies described in 1849